Broadway by the Bay, is a community-based musical theatre company located in the San Francisco Bay Area and performing in Redwood City. It also provides a "Theatre Arts Academy" offering performing arts experiences to local children. After beginning in with productions of three annual Gilbert and Sullivan productions, the company shifted its focus to modern musicals in 1966.  Since then, it has produced musicals continuously in San Mateo County.  In 1983, the group changed its name to Peninsula Civic Light Opera, and again in 1999, to Broadway by the Bay.

History
Broadway by the Bay is an outgrowth of a San Mateo Recreation Department program that originated in the 1950s as "La Honda Music Camp", in Jones Gulch, near La Honda, California in the Santa Cruz Mountains. Each summer, that program employed the talents of young musicians, singers, and actors to produce primarily Gilbert and Sullivan's comic operas, which were staged at the camp site in Jones Gulch near La Honda, California.

In June 1963, the San Mateo Recreation Department established the San Mateo Community Theatre, with Dr. Randolph Hunt (1925-2011) as music director and Robert Lynch as drama director, at Hillsdale High School in San Mateo, California. Dr. Randolph Hunt and Robert Lynch were the directors for the first two summer productions at Hillsdale High School, both of which were Gilbert and Sullivan operas.

First productions: Gilbert and Sullivan
The first production was Patience, in August 1963 in the little theatre at Hillsdale High School, with an additional performance at La Honda Music Camp.  The cast of high school and college students included a future international opera singer, soprano Luana De Vol. Hunt conducted a small orchestra of musicians from San Mateo County.  In the summer of 1964, Hunt and Lynch collaborated on The Mikado, again at Hillsdale High School with an additional performance at the camp. In 1965, Anthony "Duke" Campagne, the band director at Hillsdale High School, worked with Lynch on a production of H.M.S. Pinafore, which played at Hillsdale and one performance at La Honda Music Camp.

Move to musical theatre

After presenting the three Gilbert and Sullivan operas, the San Mateo Community Theatre moved in a different direction.  Although Campagne returned, he was joined by a staff that included Kenneth L. Ton, the drama director at Capuchino High School, and Ben Denton, the choral director at Aragon High School. For the first time, in 1966, SMCT presented a classic Broadway musical: Oklahoma! by Rodgers and Hammerstein.  Once again, the cast and orchestra were drawn from high school and college students throughout San Mateo County.  The performances were moved to the little theater at the College of San Mateo.  The production was a success and encouraged SMCT to produce more musicals.

Hunt returned as a director for the 1967 production of West Side Story by Leonard Bernstein and Stephen Sondheim.  The performances were given at the auditorium at San Mateo High School, later known as the San Mateo Performing Arts Center.  This remained the home of the company until 2011. The company continued to produce musicals each year, and later productions mixed professional and semi-professional talent with amateur singers and dancers, increasing the quality of the shows.

The San Mateo Community Theatre became a non-profit organization in 1978. In 1983, the Board of Directors expanded the focus of the company and changed the name to Peninsula Civic Light Opera.  In 1999, a decision was made to gradually change the name to Broadway by the Bay to more accurately reflect the group's focus on Broadway-type musicals instead of light operas.

Broadway by the Bay today
Broadway by the Bay is a not-for-profit corporation that produces four full-scale musical theatre productions each year. The Actors, ushers and some of the musicians are volunteers.

In 2010, composer-lyricist Jason Robert Brown offered classes and performed a concert to help fundraise for Broadway by the Bay's Youth Theatre Conservatory, which offers performing arts experiences to local children. In 2011 Broadway by the Bay moved to the Fox Theatre located at 2215 Broadway Street in Redwood City, California and it has been performing there ever since. 

The company's 2014 season included performances of Evita, In the Heights, Dreamgirls, and Anything Goes.  The 2015 season included Kiss Me, Kate, West Side Story, My Fair Lady, and more.  A review in San Jose Mercury News called the company's 2009 production of The Full Monty "strong and fast-paced ... typical of Broadway by the Bay.  [Its choreography was] smooth, clever, and wonderfully funny. There is much good acting, singing and dancing." In 2016, Broadway by the Bay signed a five year lease at the Fox Theatre.

References

External links
Official website

Theatre companies in San Francisco
Community theatre
Culture in the San Francisco Bay Area
Organizations based in San Francisco
Performing groups established in 1963